Qian Xuesen, or Hsue-Shen Tsien (11 December 1911 – 31 October 2009), was a Chinese aerospace engineer, astrodynamics scientist, physicist, and cyberneticist who made significant contributions to the field of aerodynamics and established engineering cybernetics. 

Recruited from MIT, he joined Theodore von Kármán's group at Caltech. During the Second Red Scare, in the 1950s, the US federal government accused him of communist sympathies. In 1950, despite protests by his colleagues, he was stripped of his security clearance. He decided to return to mainland China, but he was detained at Terminal Island, near Los Angeles.

After spending five years under house arrest, he was released in 1955 in exchange for the repatriation of American pilots who had been captured during the Korean War. He left the United States in September 1955 on the American President Lines passenger liner SS President Cleveland, arriving in China via Hong Kong.

Upon his return, he helped lead development of the Dongfeng ballistic missile and the Chinese space program. He also played a significant part in the establishment of China's defense industry system, higher education and research system, rocket force, and a key technology university. For his contributions, he became known as the "Father of Chinese Rocketry," nicknamed the "King of Rocketry." He is recognized as one of the founding fathers of Two Bombs, One Satellite.

In 1957, Qian was elected an academician of the Chinese Academy of Sciences. He served as a Vice Chairman of the National Committee of the Chinese People's Political Consultative Conference from 1987 to 1998.

He was the cousin of engineer Hsue-Chu Tsien, who was involved in the aerospace industries of both China and the United States. His nephew, Roger Y. Tsien, was the 2008 winner of the Nobel Prize in Chemistry.

Early life and education 
Qian was born in Shanghai International Settlement, with ancestral roots in Lin'an, Hangzhou, in 1911. He graduated from The High School Affiliated to Beijing Normal University, with Lu Shijia as classmate, and attended National Chiao Tung University (now Shanghai Jiaotong University) in 1934. There, he received a bachelor's degree in mechanical engineering with an emphasis on railroad administration. He interned at Nanchang Air Force Base.

In August 1935, Qian left mainland China on a Boxer Indemnity Scholarship to study mechanical engineering at the Massachusetts Institute of Technology (MIT), where he received a Master of Science in aeronautical engineering after one year, in 1936.

While at MIT, he was called Hsue-Shen Tsien. He was influenced by the methods of American engineering education, especially its focus on experimentation. This was in contrast to the contemporary approach practiced by many Chinese scientists, which emphasized theoretical elements rather than "hands-on" experience. Tsien's experiments included plotting of pitot pressures using mercury-filled manometers.

Theodore von Kármán, Qian's doctoral advisor, described their first meeting:

Kármán made his home a social scene for the aerodynamicists of Pasadena, and Qian was drawn in: "Tsien enjoyed visiting my home, and my sister took to him because of his interesting ideas and straightforward manner."

Shortly after arriving at the California Institute of Technology in 1936, Qian became fascinated with the rocketry ideas of Frank Malina, other students of von Kármán, and their associates, including Jack Parsons. Along with his fellow students, he was involved in rocket-related experiments at the Guggenheim Aeronautical Laboratory at Caltech. Around the university, the dangerous and explosive nature of their work earned them the nickname "Suicide Squad." Qian received a Doctor of Philosophy in aeronautics from Caltech in 1939.

Career in the United States 
During the Second World War, Qian worked in the Manhattan Project, which led to America successfully developing the first atomic bomb. In 1943, Qian and two other members of their rocketry group drafted the first document to use the name Jet Propulsion Laboratory (JPL), originally a proposal to the Army for developing missiles in response to Germany's V-2 rocket. This led to Private A, which flew in 1944, and later, the Corporal, the WAC Corporal, and other designs.

In 1945, as an Army colonel with a security clearance, Qian was sent to Germany to investigate laboratories and question German scientists, including Wernher von Braun, and "to recruit German scientists for the American missile program".

Von Kármán wrote of Qian, "At the age of 36, he was an undisputed genius whose work was providing an enormous impetus to advances in high-speed aerodynamics and jet propulsion." During this time, he worked on designing an intercontinental space plane, which would later inspire the X-20 Dyna-Soar, a precursor to the American Space Shuttle.

Qian married Jiang Ying (蒋英), a famed opera singer and the daughter of Jiang Baili (蒋百里) and his wife, Japanese nurse Satô Yato. The elder Jiang was a military strategist and adviser to Kuomintang leader Chiang Kai-shek. The Qians were married on 14 September 1947 in Shanghai, and had two children; their son Qian Yonggang (钱永刚, also known as Yucon Qian) was born in Boston on 13 October 1948, while their daughter Qian Yongzhen (钱永真) was born in early 1950 when the family was residing in Pasadena, California.

Shortly after his wedding, Qian returned to America to take up a teaching position at MIT. Jiang Ying would join him in December 1947. In 1949, with the recommendation of von Kármán, Qian became a Robert H. Goddard Professor of Jet Propulsion at Caltech.

In 1947, Qian was granted a permanent resident permit, and in 1949, he applied for naturalization, although he could not obtain citizenship. Except for the memories of a few individuals, there is no other official proof indicating that Qian had tried to apply for naturalization. Years later, his wife Jiang Ying said in an interview with Phoenix Television that Qian did not apply for naturalization at all.

Detention 
By the early 1940s, US Army Intelligence was already aware of allegations that Qian was a communist, but his security clearance was not suspended until prior to the Korean War. Suddenly, on June 6, 1950, his security clearance was revoked and Qian was questioned by the FBI. Two weeks later, Qian announced that he would be resigning from Caltech and returning to mainland China, which, by then, was effectively governed by the Chinese Communist Party led by Mao Zedong.

In August, Qian had a conversation on the subject with the then Under Secretary of the Navy Dan A. Kimball, whom Qian knew on a personal basis. After Qian told him of the allegations, Kimball responded, "Hell, I don't think you're a communist", at which point Qian indicated that he still intended to leave the country, saying, "I'm Chinese. I don't want to build weapons to kill my countrymen. It's that simple." Kimball then said, "I won't let you out of the country."

After the firm in charge of arranging Qian's move back to mainland China tipped off U.S. Customs that some of the papers encountered among his possessions were marked "Secret" or "Confidential," U.S. officials seized them from a Pasadena warehouse. The U.S. Immigration and Naturalization Service issued a warrant for Qian's arrest on August 25. Qian claimed that the security-stamped documents were mostly written by himself and had outdated classifications, adding that, "There were some drawings and logarithm tables, etc., which someone might have mistaken for codes." Included in the material was a scrapbook with news clippings about the trials of those charged with atomic espionage, such as Klaus Fuchs. Subsequent examination of the documents showed they contained no classified material.

While at Caltech, Qian had secretly attended meetings with J. Robert Oppenheimer's brother Frank Oppenheimer, Jack Parsons, and Frank Malina that were organized by the Russian-born Jewish chemist Sidney Weinbaum and called Professional Unit 122 of the Pasadena Communist Party.  Weinbaum's trial commenced on 30 August and both Frank Oppenheimer and Parsons testified against him. Weinbaum was convicted of perjury and sentenced to four years. Qian was taken into custody on 6 September 1950, for questioning and for two weeks was detained at Terminal Island, a low-security United States federal prison near the ports of Los Angeles and Long Beach.

When Qian had returned from mainland China with his new bride in 1947, he had answered "no" on an immigration questionnaire that asked if he ever had been a member of an organization advocating overthrow of the U.S. Government by force. This, together with an American Communist Party document from 1938 with Qian's name on it, was used to argue that Qian was a national security threat. Prosecutors also cited a cross-examination session where Qian said, "I owe allegiance to the people of mainland China" and would "certainly not" let the United States government make his decision for him as to whom he would owe allegiance to in the event of a conflict between the U.S. and communist China.

On 26 April 1951, Qian was declared subject to deportation and forbidden from leaving Los Angeles County without permission, effectively placing him under house arrest.

During this time, Qian wrote Engineering Cybernetics, which was published by McGraw Hill in 1954. The book deals with the practice of stabilizing servomechanisms. In its 18 chapters, it considers non-interacting controls of many-variable systems, control design by perturbation theory, and von Neumann's theory of error control (chapter 18). Ezra Krendel reviewed the book, stating that it is "difficult to overstate the value of Qian's book to those interested in the overall theory of complex control systems." Evidently, Qian's approach is primarily practical, as Krendel notes that for servomechanisms, the "usual linear design criterion of stability is inadequate and other criteria arising from the physics of the problem must be used."

Return to Mainland China 

Qian became the subject of five years of secret diplomacy and negotiation between the U.S. and Mainland China. During this time, he lived under constant surveillance with the permission to teach without any classified research duties. Qian received support from his colleagues at Caltech during his incarceration, including president Lee DuBridge, who flew to Washington to argue Qian's case. Caltech appointed attorney Grant Cooper to defend Qian.

The travel ban on Qian was lifted on August 4, 1955, and he resigned from Caltech shortly thereafter. Qian arrived at Hong Kong on 8 October 1955, and entered China via the Kowloon–Canton Railway later that day.

Under Secretary Kimball, who had tried for several years to keep Qian in the U.S., commented on his treatment: "It was the stupidest thing this country ever did. He was no more a communist than I was, and we forced him to go."

Upon his return, Qian began a remarkably successful career in rocket science, boosted by the reputation he garnered for his past achievements as well as Chinese state support for his nuclear research. He led, and eventually became the father, of the Chinese missile program, which constructed the Dongfeng ballistic missiles and the Long March space rockets.

Chinese rocket and space program and other studies 
In October 1956, he became the director of the Fifth Academy of the Ministry of National Defense, tasked with ballistic missile and nuclear weapons development.

Qian's reputation as a prominent scientist who was caught up in the red scare in the United States gave him considerable influence in the era of Chinese communist leader Mao Zedong and afterward. Qian eventually rose through Party ranks to become a Central Committee of the Chinese Communist Party member. He became associated with the China's Space Program - From Conception to Manned Spaceflight initiative.

Qian was elected as an academician of the Chinese Academy of Sciences in 1957, a lifelong honor granted to Chinese scientists who have made significant advancements in their field. He organized scientific seminars and dedicated some of his time to training successors for his positions.

He was heavily involved in the establishment of the University of Science and Technology of China (USTC) in 1958 and served as the Chairman of the Department of Modern Mechanics of the university for a number of years.

In 1969, Qian was one of a group of scientists who spoke with an Australian journalist, describing China's first seven nuclear tests and details of a gaseous diffusion plant near Lanzhou.

Outside of rocketry, Qian had a presence in numerous areas of study. He was among the creators of systematics, and made contributions to science and technology systems, somatic science, engineering science, military science, social science, the natural sciences, geography, philosophy, literature and art, and education. His advancements in the concepts, theories, and methods of the system science field include studying the open complex giant system. Additionally, he helped establish the Chinese school of complexity science.

Alternative medicine
From the 1980s onward, Qian had advocated the scientific investigation of traditional Chinese medicine, qigong, and the pseudoscientific concept of "special human body functions". He particularly encouraged scientists to accumulate observational data on qigong so that "future scientific theories could be established".

Later life 

Qian retired in 1991 and lived quietly in Beijing, refusing to speak to Westerners.

In 1979, Qian was awarded Caltech's Distinguished Alumni Award for his achievements. Qian eventually received his award from Caltech, and with the help of his friend Frank Marble, brought it to his home in a widely covered ceremony. Furthermore, in the early 1990s, the filing cabinets containing Qian's research work were offered to him by Caltech.

Qian was invited to visit the US by the American Institute of Aeronautics and Astronautics after the normalization of the Sino-US relationship, but he refused the invitation, having wanted a formal apology for his detention. In a reminiscence published in 2002, Marble stated that he believed Qian had "lost faith in the American government" but that he had "always had very warm feelings for the American people."

The Chinese government launched its manned space program in 1992, reportedly with some help from Russia due to their extended history in space. Qian's research was used as the basis for the Long March rocket, which successfully launched the Shenzhou 5 mission in October 2003. The elderly Qian was able to watch China's first manned space mission on television from his hospital bed.
 
In 2008, he was named Aviation Week & Space Technology Person of the Year. The recognition was not intended as an honor, but is given to the person judged to have the greatest impact on aviation in the past year. Furthermore, that year China Central Television named Qian as one of the eleven most inspiring people in China.

In July 2009, the Omega Alpha Association, an international systems engineering honor society, named Qian (H. S. Tsien) one of four Honorary Members.

On October 31, 2009, Qian died at the age of 97 in Beijing from lung illness.

A Chinese film production, Hsue-shen Tsien, directed by Zhang Jianya and starring Chen Kun as Qian, was simultaneously released in Asia and North America on December 11, 2011, and on March 2, 2012, it was released in China.

Selected works

Scientific papers 
 1938: (with Theodore von Karman) "Boundary Layer in Compressible Fluids", Journal of Aeronautical Sciences, April 
 1938: "Supersonic Flow Over an Inclined Body of Revolution", Journal of Aeronautical Sciences, October
 1938: (with Frank Malina) "Flight analysis of a Sounding Rocket with Special Reference to Propulsion by Successive Impulses", Journal of Aeronautical Sciences, December
 1939: Two-dimensional subsonic flow of compressible fluids, Journal of Aeronautical Sciences 6(10): 399–407.
 1939: (with Theodore von Kármán) The buckling of thin cylindrical shells under axial compression, Journal of Aeronautical Sciences 7(2):43 to 50.
 1943: "Symmetrical Joukowsky Airfoils in shear flow", Quarterly of Applied Mathematics, 1: 130–48.
 1943: On the Design of the Contraction Cone for a Wind Tunnel, Journal of Aeronautical Sciences, 10(2): 68–70.
 1945: (with Theodore von Kármán), "Lifting- line Theory for a Wing in Nonuniform Flow," Quarterly of Applied Mathematics, 3: 1–11.
 1946: "Similarity laws of hypersonic flows", MIT Journal of Mathematics and Physics 25: 247–251, .
 1946: "Superaerodynamics, Mechanics of Rarefied Gases", Journal of the Aeronautical Sciences, 13 (12)
 1949: "Rockets and Other Thermal Jets Using Nuclear Energy", in The Science and Engineering of Nuclear Power, Addison-Wesley, Vol. 2.
 1950: "Instruction and Research at the Daniel and Florence Guggenheim Jet Propulsion Center", Journal of the American Rocket Society, June 1950
 1951: "Optimum Thrust Programming for a Sounding Rocket" (with Robert C. Evans), Journal of the American Rocket Society 21(5)
 1952: "The Transfer Functions of Rocket Nozzles", Journal of the American Rocket Society 22(3)
 1952: "A Similarity Law for Stressing Rapidly Heated Thin-Walled Cylinders" (with C.M.Cheng), Journal of the American Rocket Society 22(3)
 1952: "Automatic Navigation of a Long Range Rocket Vehicle", (with T.D.Adamson and E.L. Knuth) Journal of the American Rocket Society 22(4)
 1952: "A Method for Comparing the Performance of Power Plants for Vertical Flight", Journal of the American Rocket Society 22(4)
 1952: "Serbo-Stabilization of Combustion in Rocket Motors", Journal of the American Rocket Society 22(5)
 1953: "Physical Mechanics, a New Field in Engineering Science", Journal of the American Rocket Society 23(1)
 1953: "The Properties of Pure Liquids", Journal of the American Rocket Society 23(1)
 1953: "Take-Off from Satellite Orbit", Journal of the American Rocket Society 23(4)
 1956: "The Poincaré-Lighthill-Kuo Method", Advances in Applied Mechanics 4: 281–349, .
 1958: "The equations of gas dynamics", in Fundamentals of Gas Dynamics v. 3, Princeton University Press, .

Monographs 
 1954: 
 1957: 
 2007:

Biographies 
 Thread of the Silkworm (1996) by Iris Chang

See also 

 Aeronautics
 Engineering cybernetics
 Jet Propulsion Laboratory
 Theodore von Kármán
 Chien-Shiung Wu
 Ye Qisun
 Guo Yonghuai
 Hsue-Chu Tsien
 McCarthyism
 People's Liberation Army Rocket Force
 Dongfeng (missile)
 Chinese space program
 Long March (rocket family)
 Chinese nuclear program
 Project 596
 Test No. 6
 China Aerospace Science and Technology Corporation (formerly known as the Fifth Academy of the Ministry of Defense)

References

Citations

Sources 
 Works cited

 
 O'Donnell, Franklin (2002). JPL 101 . California Institute of Technology. JPL 400–1048.
 Harvey, Brian (2004). China's Space Program: From Conception to Manned Spaceflight. Springer-Verlag. .

External links 

 China, Encyclopedia Astronautica
 CNN.com timeline of China space program
 

1911 births
2009 deaths
20th-century Chinese engineers
20th-century Chinese mathematicians
21st-century Chinese engineers
21st-century Chinese mathematicians
Aerodynamicists
Anti-communism in the United States
Boxer Indemnity Scholarship recipients
California Institute of Technology alumni
California Institute of Technology faculty
China–United States relations
Chinese aerospace engineers
Chinese expatriates in the United States
Cyberneticists
Early spaceflight scientists
Engineers from Zhejiang
Jet Propulsion Laboratory faculty
Manhattan Project people
MIT School of Engineering alumni
Mathematicians from Zhejiang
Members of the Chinese Academy of Engineering
Members of the Chinese Academy of Sciences
People deported from the United States
People's Republic of China science writers
Rocket scientists
Space program of the People's Republic of China
Tsien family
Academic staff of the University of Science and Technology of China
Vice Chairpersons of the National Committee of the Chinese People's Political Consultative Conference
Burials at Babaoshan Revolutionary Cemetery
Victims of McCarthyism
United States Army colonels
United States Army Air Forces colonels
National Chiao Tung University (Shanghai) alumni